Jean-Claude Grèt (21 October 1930 – 10 July 2001) was a Swiss racing cyclist. He was the Swiss National Road Race champion in 1958.

References

External links
 

1930 births
2001 deaths
Swiss male cyclists
Sportspeople from Lausanne
20th-century Swiss people
21st-century Swiss people